Rana Rahimpour (born 9 January 1983) is an Iranian-British journalist who works for the BBC. She has anchored and covered many major Iranian and international stories for the network.

Life
Rahimpour was born on 9 January 1983 in Tehran, Iran. She was raised in Tehran. Rahimpour attended university in Iran and lived there for the first 25 years of her life. She studied English-Persian Translation at the Islamic Azad University and accounting at Al-Zahra University. She moved to London in 2008 to work for  BBC Persian TV. 

She has covered major stories including Iran's nuclear programme, Iran's Presidential elections 2009 and its aftermath both for BBC Persian television and BBC World Service and the Iranian Presidential election of 2013. As a bilingual reporter, Rahimpour covers Iranian politics on multiple BBC platforms, including the flagship news programme Newsnight. Since the beginning of 2018, Rahimpour has appeared on News At Ten. Rahimpour's Toothpaste piece for BBC Radio 4's From Our Own Correspondents was on the program's 2018 highlights. She interviewed BBC's John Simpson for the 40th anniversary of Iranian Revolution of 1979.

She is one of the outspoken advocates of free press and has been campaigning against the harassment of BBC Persian journalists and their family members in Iran. In 2018, she addressed the United Nation's Human Rights Council in Geneva, calling for an end to the intimidation of journalists by the Iranian authorities.

In 2022 Rahimpour presented the Association for International Broadcasting's awards dinner giving "AIB"s to leading people and companies involved in International Broadcasting.

Controversies 
In January 2016, despite being British, Rahimpour was banned from travelling to the United States because of her Iranian nationality.

References 

Living people
British journalists
British people of Iranian descent
BBC World Service presenters
1983 births